Granville S. Waiters (January 8, 1961 – March 23, 2021) was an American professional basketball player.

At 6 ft 11 in (2.11 m) and 225 lb (102 kg), Waiters played center. As a senior in high school, Waiters helped Columbus East to a state championship over St. Joseph, who were led by his eventual Buckeyes and Pacers teammate Clark Kellogg. During the 1982-83 season for Ohio State, he was a team captain and averaged 10.4 points and 7.5 rebounds per game.

He was drafted by the Portland Trail Blazers in the second round of the 1983 NBA Draft. The Blazers sold his draft rights to the Indiana Pacers, and Waiters spent his first two seasons in Indiana. He then played one year for the Houston Rockets which saw him make an appearance in the 1986 NBA Finals and then two years for the Chicago Bulls, before he left the NBA for Europe in 1988. On Waiters’ role as a key bench player focused on defense and rebounding on the early Jordan Bulls, head coach Doug Collins said "He never complained. He played his heart out. He was an awesome guy, a gentle giant off the court..." Waiters averaged 2.4 points and 2.2 rebounds throughout his NBA career.

From 1988 to 1990 Waiters played in the Spanish league as a member of FC Barcelona Basquet and Cajabilbao. Until his death, he was involved with humanitarian efforts in his native Ohio.

Waiters died on March 23, 2021 in Columbus, at the age of 60. On his passing, former teammate Brad Sellers said "…he taught young players like me what it was to be a professional, how to be appreciative of your moment. He was a great guy to have in the locker room. Granville was like, ‘Listen here, work hard, do your part.' He always acted older than he was, carried himself like that. Just a good guy to be around and have as a teammate."

References

External links

Personal Web Site

1961 births
2021 deaths
African-American basketball players
American expatriate basketball people in Spain
American men's basketball players
Basketball players from Columbus, Ohio
Centers (basketball)
Chicago Bulls players
FC Barcelona Bàsquet players
Houston Rockets players
Indiana Pacers players
Liga ACB players
Ohio State Buckeyes men's basketball players
Portland Trail Blazers draft picks
20th-century African-American sportspeople
21st-century African-American people